Alastair Bray (born 23 April 1993) is an Australian professional footballer who plays as a goalkeeper for South Melbourne FC in the National Premier Leagues Victoria.

Career
After featuring for the NYL sides of both Melbourne Victory and Melbourne Heart, Bray joined Bentleigh Greens during the 2013 season. During his time at the club he received a call-up to the Olyroos squad.
At the conclusion of the 2015 season Bray was released by Bentleigh and subsequently signed by Green Gully although he left the club without playing a game to trial with A-League club Central Coast Mariners.

Central Coast Mariners
In January 2016, Bray signed for Central Coast on a six-month deal. He made his debut for the side on 16 January 2016 in a loss to Adelaide United. In June 2016 it was announced that Bray would not be signing a new contract to stay at the Mariners.

Following his release from the Mariners, Bray returned to Melbourne Victory on trial, featuring in a friendly against NPL side Port Melbourne SC in August 2016.

Melbourne Victory 
On 23 September 2016, Bray signed a one-year deal with Melbourne Victory, where he had previously spent two years as a youth player. On 12 May 2017, Bray was released by the club.

South Melbourne FC
On 2 February 2018, Bray signed a two-year contract with South Melbourne FC.
He made his debut for the club in round 1 of the NPL Victoria season against Bulleen Lions, however in the final moments of the match, he suffered a season ending ACL injury.

See also
 List of Central Coast Mariners FC players

References

External links

1993 births
Living people
Association football goalkeepers
Australian soccer players
Central Coast Mariners FC players
Melbourne Victory FC players
A-League Men players
National Premier Leagues players